New Harmony may refer to:

Places
 New Harmony, Indiana
 New Harmony, Mississippi
 New Harmony, Missouri
 New Harmony, Ohio
 New Harmony, Tennessee
 New Harmony, Texas
 New Harmony, Utah

Organisation
New Harmony (Latvia), Latvian political party

See also
 Ulmus americana 'New Harmony', cultivar of elm